The 7th constituency of Alpes-Maritimes is a French legislative constituency currently represented by Éric Pauget of The Republicans (LR).  It contains the town and surrounding areas of Antibes.

Historic Representation

Election results

2022

 
 
 
 
|-
| colspan="8" bgcolor="#E9E9E9"|
|-

2017

2012

2007

2002

 
 
 
 
 
|-
| colspan="8" bgcolor="#E9E9E9"|
|-

1997

 
 
 
 
 
 
|-
| colspan="8" bgcolor="#E9E9E9"|
|-
 
 

 
 
 
 
 

*RPR dissident

References

Sources
Results at the Ministry of the Interior (French)

7